is a Japanese manga series written and illustrated by Shunju Aono. It was serialized in Shogakukan's seinen manga magazine Monthly Ikki from January 2007 to June 2012, with its chapters collected in five tankōbon volumes. It was adapted into a live-action film released in June 2013. In North America, the manga was licensed for English release by Viz Media.

Plot
Shizuo Ōguro is a forty-year-old salaryman going through a midlife crisis. He quits his job of fifteen years to find himself, despite being a single parent living with his teenage daughter and elderly father. Ōguro embarks on a hapless journey to achieve his dream of becoming a manga artist.

Characters

Miyata's wife

Media

Manga
I'll Give It My All... A one-shot chapter was published in Shogakukan's Monthly Ikki on January 25, 2007. The manga began its serialization in the same magazine on March 24, 2007. In November 2008, the manga entered on hiatus due to Aono's health issues. It resumed publication on September 25, 2009. The manga finished on June 25, 2012. Shogakukan collected its chapters in five tankōbon volumes, released from October 30, 2007, to September 28, 2012.

In North America, Viz Media announced the English language release of the manga in May 2009. The five volumes were released from May 18, 2010, to July 16, 2013.

A spin-off series, titled  was serialized in Monthly Ikki from December 25, 2012, to April 25, 2013. Shogakukan compiled its chapters into a single tankōbon volume, published on May 30, 2013.

Volume list

Live-action film
A live-action film adaptation was announced in June 2012. The film is directed by Yūichi Fukuda, starring Shinichi Tsutsumi as Shizuo Ōguro. The acoustic guitar duo Gontiti scored the music and the all-female band Scandal performed the film's song theme . The film was distributed by Shochiku and premiered on June 15, 2013

Explanatory notes

References

Further reading

External links
 I'll Give It My All... Tomorrow official manga website at Ikki 
 I'll Give It My All... Tomorrow official live-action film website 
 
 

Comedy anime and manga
Films directed by Yūichi Fukuda
Live-action films based on manga
Manga adapted into films
Manga creation in anime and manga 
Midlife crisis in fiction
Seinen manga
Shochiku films
Shogakukan manga
Slice of life anime and manga
Viz Media manga
Japanese comedy films